The 1940 Rhode Island gubernatorial election was held on November 5, 1940. Democratic nominee J. Howard McGrath defeated incumbent Republican William Henry Vanderbilt III with 55.84% of the vote.

General election

Candidates
Major party candidates
J. Howard McGrath, Democratic 
William Henry Vanderbilt III, Republican

Other candidates
Wilfred J. Boissy, Communist

Results

References

1940
Rhode Island
Gubernatorial